Elke U. Weber  (born April 6, 1957) is a Professor of Psychology and Public Affairs at Princeton University where she holds the Gerhard R. Andlinger Professorship in Energy & the Environment. Prior to moving to Princeton in 2016, she spent 19 years at Columbia University, where she founded and co-directed the Earth Institute's Center for Research on Environmental Decisions  and the Columbia Business School's Center for Decision Sciences.

Career 

Weber received a B.A. in Psychology from York University in 1980 and a PhD. in Psychology from Harvard University in 1984. She began her professional career at the University of Illinois at Urbana-Champaign in 1985. From 1988 to 1995 she was Assistant and then Associate Professor of Behavioral Science at the University of Chicago's Graduate School of Business. In 1995 she joined Ohio State University as Professor in the Departments of Psychology and Management and Human Resources. In 1999 Weber joined Columbia University as a Professor of Management and Professor of Psychology, where she was a Jerome A. Chazen Professor of International Business until 2016. In 2016, she joined the faculty at Princeton as a Professor of Psychology and Public Policy. In 2020, Weber was elected to the National Academy of Sciences

Weber's specialty  is  judgment and decision-making under risk and uncertainty. Her research has investigated psychologically appropriate ways to measure and model individual and cultural differences in risk taking, specifically in risky financial situations and environmental decision making and policy. She also does  research related to Query Theory and the role that memory processes play in preference construction. More recently, she is known for her contributions to research on choice architecture and how to apply decision research to public policy.

Weber has served as President of the Society for Neuroeconomics, the Society for Mathematical Psychology, and the Society for Judgment and Decision Making.

Honors 
She received an honorary degree from the University of Basel in 2009.

Weblinks 
 Own website with Curriculum Vitae

References 

1957 births
Living people
Princeton University faculty
Columbia University faculty
Columbia Business School faculty
Harvard Graduate School of Arts and Sciences alumni
York University alumni
University of Illinois Urbana-Champaign faculty
Ohio State University faculty
Fellows of the American Academy of Arts and Sciences
Members of the United States National Academy of Sciences